Khormarud may refer to:
 Khormarud, Gilan
 Khormarud-e Jonubi Rural District, in Golestan Province
 Khormarud-e Shomali Rural District, in Golestan Province